Taylor Bright (born July 4, 1993) is a musical artist, songwriter and actress, who gained notoriety through a viral online video she released while still in high school for her song "Striped Socks".

The song was remixed and landed on the Billboard chart for Dance Club music.  Bright is continuing to pursue music and acting while attending college at Brown University.

Bright grew up in Philadelphia, and has been involved in various performing arts.  Bright began performing on stage and earned a role in the 30th Anniversary National Tour of Annie at the age of 12.

Once she began performing, Bright developed an interest in making pop music and wrote her first song at the age of 10.  Bright's homemade video for "Striped Socks" garnered her international fame at the age of 15.

Bright was then contacted by DJ Mike Rizzo, who remixed the song.  Rizzo’s version climbed the Billboard Dance Club Play Top 50 chart all the way to No. 29, and spent 11 weeks on the chart.

Bright is pursuing music and acting in Los Angeles while continuing her studies.

Bright was nominated for a Grammy in 2010 for her contribution to Healthy Food For Thought in the Spoken Word category.

Credits 

 Annie Warbucks - Walnut Street Theatre (2004)
 30th Anniversary Tour of Annie - National (2005)
 American Girl Circle of Friends - New York (2006)
 Carousel - Walnut Street Theatre (2006)
 13 The Musical - Godspeed Theatre (2008)
 Camplified (2009, 2011)

References 

1993 births
Living people
American women singer-songwriters
American women pop singers
21st-century American actresses
Musicians from Philadelphia
Singer-songwriters from Pennsylvania
21st-century American women singers
21st-century American singers